Geocronite is a mineral, a mixed sulfosalt containing lead, antimony, and arsenic with a formula of Pb14(Sb, As)6S23. Geocronite is the antimony-rich endmember of a solid solution series. The arsenic-rich endmember is named jordanite. It occurs as grey, black, to silvery white monoclinic crystals. It is found in hydrothermal veins usually associated with other similar minerals, particularly the sulfides of iron and copper.

The mineral has been found in Spain, Ireland and Sweden where it was first identified in 1839.

References

External links 
Webmineral
Mindat
Mineral Galleries

Lead minerals
Arsenic minerals
Antimony minerals
Sulfosalt minerals
Monoclinic minerals
Minerals in space group 11